During the 20th century, the NCAA had no playoff for the major college football teams in the University Division, later known as Division I-A. The NCAA did recognize a national champion based upon the final results of "wire service" (AP and UPI) polls.  The "writers' poll" by Associated Press (AP) was the most popular, followed by the "coaches' poll" by United Press International) (UPI).  Prior to 1965, both services issued their final polls at the close of the regular season, but before teams competed in bowl games.  For the 1965 season, the AP took its final poll after the postseason games, an arrangement made permanent in 1968.  The Associated Press presented the "AP Trophy" to the winner.

The AP poll in 1965 consisted of the votes of 55 sportswriters, each of whom would give their opinion of the ten best teams.  Under a point system of ten points for first place, nine for second, etc., the "overall" ranking was determined.  In the preseason poll for 1965, the writers cast first place votes for nine different teams, and the range of points between the highest six finishers ranged from 252 to 311 points.  Nebraska was first, followed by Texas, Notre Dame, Michigan, Alabama, and Arkansas.  As the regular season progressed, new polls were issued weekly on Mondays.

At season's end, Michigan State, Arkansas, and Nebraska were all unbeaten at 10–0. As champions of their respective conferences (Big Ten, Southwest, and Big Eight), they played in three separate bowl games (Rose, Cotton, and Orange) on New Year's Day. Arkansas and Michigan State lost during the day, and Alabama defeated Nebraska at night in Miami. In the final poll, taken after the bowls, Alabama was crowned the national champion by the Associated Press.  The Crimson Tide had been first in both final polls at the end of the 1964 regular season and crowned as national champions, but lost the Orange Bowl.

In addition to 1964 and 1965, the UPI national champions in 1970 and 1973 also lost their respective bowl games. Beginning with the 1974 season, the UPI released its final poll after the bowls.

Rule changes
 Free substitution is now permitted only on changes of possession, which brought back the two-platoon system to college football.
 A two-inch (5 cm) kicking tee was allowed for kickoffs; this was reduced to one-inch (2½ cm) in 2006.

Conference and program changes
The New England Football Conference, now a Division III conference, began football play in 1965.

The AP Regular Season Poll
In the preseason poll released on September 13, the top five teams were from different conferences.  First place was the Nebraska Cornhuskers (Big 8) followed by Texas (Southwest), independent Notre Dame, Michigan of the Big Ten and Alabama from the Southeastern Conference (SEC).  Arkansas, the SWC rival to Texas, was No. 6, followed by USC from the AAWU (later Pacific-8, Pac-10, and now Pac-12).

September
In Week One (September 18) No. 5 Alabama and No. 7 USC both fell out of the Top Ten.  USC played Minnesota to a 20–20 tie on a Friday night game in Los Angeles while Alabama narrowly lost to Georgia, 18–17. No. 1 Nebraska beat Texas Christian (TCU) at home, 34–14.  No. 2 Texas shut out Tulane 31–0 in a game which was shifted from New Orleans to Austin due to the devastation of Hurricane Betsy across the Crescent City. No. 3 Notre Dame crushed California 48–6 at Berkeley, and No. 4 Michigan won 31–24 at North Carolina. No. 6 Arkansas beat Oklahoma State 28–14. Following its big win, Notre Dame rose to No. 1 in the next poll, Nebraska and Texas fell to 2nd and 3rd, Michigan stayed at No. 4 and Arkansas was No. 5. In a matchup which would later have national championship implications, Michigan State defeated UCLA 13–3 at East Lansing.

On September 25, No. 1 Notre Dame stayed in Indiana as it lost to No. 6 Purdue 25–21 at West Lafayette. No. 2 Nebraska won 27–17 over Air Force in Colorado Springs, and No. 3 Texas beat Texas Tech 33–7. No. 4 Michigan barely won over unranked California 10–7 and No. 5 Arkansas defeated Tulsa 20–12. No. 7 LSU won 42–14 over Rice. In the next poll, Texas, Purdue and Nebraska had had 15, 14 and 13 first place votes in a tight race for No. 1, No. 2 and No. 3.  Arkansas rose to No. 4, while LSU placed fifth. Michigan State entered the poll at No. 9 with a 23−0 shutout of Penn State.

October
October 2, No. 1 Texas hosted Indiana and won 27–12. No. 2 Purdue played SMU to a 14–14 tie in Dallas. No. 3 Nebraska shut out Iowa State 44–0, while No. 4 Arkansas blanked TCU 28–0.  In an SEC matchup at Gainesville, visiting No. 5 LSU fell to the Florida Gators 14–7.  No. 10 Georgia beat No. 7 Michigan 15–7 in Ann Arbor, while No. 9 Michigan State beat Illinois at home, 22–12.  The next poll was No. 1 Texas, No. 2 Nebraska, No. 3 Arkansas, No. 4 Georgia, and No. 5 Michigan State.

In October 9 play, all five of the top teams remained unbeaten. No. 1 Texas shut out Oklahoma, 19–0 at Dallas.  No. 2 Nebraska held visiting Wisconsin scoreless 37–0.  No. 3 Arkansas won at Baylor 38–7 and No. 4 Georgia beat Clemson at home, 23–9. No. 5 Michigan State followed Georgia's visit to Ann Arbor with one of its own, beating Michigan 24–7. The Spartans and Bulldogs traded places in the next poll, which was No. 1 Texas, No. 2 Nebraska, No. 3 Arkansas, No. 4 Michigan State, and No. 5 Georgia.

On October 16, No. 1 Texas met No. 3 Arkansas at Fayetteville in a Southwest Conference matchup between two 4–0 teams, and Arkansas won 27–24.  Meanwhile, No. 2 Nebraska recorded its third straight shutout, a 41–0 win at Kansas State. In a game that ultimately decided the Big Ten title, No. 4 Michigan State beat Ohio State 32–7, and No. 5 Georgia lost 10–3 to Florida State at Tallahassee.  No. 6 USC beat Stanford 14–0 and remained unbeaten at 4–0–1. Arkansas was the new No. 1 in the next poll, followed by No. 2 Michigan State, No. 3 Nebraska, No. 4 USC, and No. 5 Texas.

October 23: No. 1 Arkansas defeated North Texas State 55–20 at Little Rock, No. 2 Michigan State won 14–10 at No. 6 Purdue, and No. 3 Nebraska beat Colorado 38–13.  No. 4 USC fell 28–7 to No. 7 Notre Dame at South Bend, and No. 5 Texas lost its second straight game, falling 20–17 to Rice.  After their 4–0 start, the Longhorns finished the season at 6–4. No. 9 LSU beat South Carolina 21–7. In the next poll, Michigan State received fewer first place votes than Arkansas, but had seven more points overall, 473–466, while Nebraska was third.  The three teams were the last to remain unbeaten, all with 6–0 records.  Notre Dame was No. 4 and LSU was No. 5.

October 30 No. 1 Michigan State overwhelmed Northwestern 49–7 at home in East Lansing.  Playing in Little Rock, No. 2 Arkansas shut out Texas A&M 31–0. No. 3 Nebraska won a close one, 16–14, at Missouri and No. 4 Notre Dame won 29–3 over Navy.  No. 5 LSU was shut out at home by Mississippi, 23–0.  Meanwhile, No. 10 Alabama beat Mississippi State 10–7 at Jackson. The next poll featured No. 1 Michigan State, No. 2 Arkansas, No. 3 Nebraska, No. 4 Notre Dame, and No. 5 Alabama.

November
On November 6, No. 1 Michigan State won 35–0 at Iowa, No. 2 Arkansas won 31–0 at Rice, and No. 3 Nebraska won 42–6 over Kansas.  All three remained unbeaten, with 8–0 records. No. 4 Notre Dame rolled over host Pittsburgh 69–13, and No. 5 Alabama won 31–7 at LSU. The top five remained the same.

November 13  The top three extended their records to 9–0.  No. 1 Michigan State beat Indiana 27–13 to guarantee itself the Big Ten title and a trip to Pasadena for the Rose Bowl.  No. 2 Arkansas beat SMU 24–3 at Dallas.  No. 3 Nebraska had a surprisingly difficult game against 1–6 Oklahoma State, winning 21–17 at Stillwater, but still clinched the Big 8 title and a berth in the Orange Bowl. No. 4 Notre Dame shut out visiting North Carolina, 17–0, and No. 5 Alabama beat South Carolina 35–14 at home. The top five again remained the same.

November 20: With its Big Ten title assured, No. 1 Michigan State visited its most difficult opponent yet, No. 4 Notre Dame, with hopes of finishing its season unbeaten.  The Spartans won, 12–3.  Though unbeaten, No. 2 Arkansas was only a game ahead of No. 9 Texas Tech (6–0 vs. 5–1) in SWC play.  The two met at Arkansas, and the Razorbacks beat the Red Raiders 42–24 to get a spot in the Cotton Bowl. No. 3 Nebraska and No. 5 Alabama had the week off. In Los Angeles, No. 7 UCLA beat No. 6 USC 20–16 to win the AAWU (Pac-8) title, a Rose Bowl berth, and the opportunity to avenge their early-season loss to Michigan State. Unranked LSU destroyed Tulane 62–0 (the third time in the past eight meetings the Tigers defeated the Green Wave by that score) and earned a berth in the Cotton Bowl opposite Arkansas. The next poll featured No. 1 Michigan State, No. 2 Arkansas, No. 3 Nebraska, No. 4 UCLA, and No. 5 Alabama.

Thanksgiving Day, No. 3 Nebraska beat Oklahoma at home in Lincoln, 21–9 to finish with a 10−0 record.  No. 5 Alabama met Auburn (which was surprisingly undefeated in SEC play despite losing three of their four non-conference games) in their annual season closer at Birmingham on Saturday. The Crimson Tide beat the Tigers 30–3. For the second straight year, SEC champion Alabama would play in the Orange Bowl rather than the Sugar Bowl; the latter game matched No. 6 Missouri against Florida. The next AP Poll was No. 1 Michigan State, No. 2 Arkansas, No. 3 Nebraska, No. 4 Alabama, and No. 5 UCLA.

On the following December 4, No. 5 UCLA lost to No. 7 Tennessee 37–34 in a game marred by a questionable pass interference call and the clock stopping for no apparent reason during Tennessee's last-minute drive. However, the Bruins were not penalized by the AP voters, who did not release a poll after this week. Instead, the AP planned to take its final poll after the bowl games, as its top six teams were all playing on New Year's Day.

Conference standings

Bowl games

Major bowls
Saturday, January 1, 1966

The top three teams in the polls were upset, starting with LSU's 14–7 win over No. 2 Arkansas in the Cotton Bowl. Then came an even bigger stunner, as 13-point underdog UCLA bested top-ranked Michigan State in the Rose Bowl, 14–12. Trailing by eight points, Michigan State scored a touchdown in the final minute but the two-point conversion attempt to tie was stopped just short of the goal line. With the top two teams defeated, the Orange Bowl game that night between No. 3 Nebraska and No. 4 Alabama would determine the national champion. Alabama, led by QB Steve Sloan, beat Nebraska 39–28 to claim the national title. The final AP poll, released three days after the bowls, was No. 1 Alabama, No. 2 Michigan State, No. 3 Arkansas, No. 4 UCLA, and No. 5 Nebraska.

Other bowls

 Prior to the 1975 season, the Big Ten and Pac-8 (AAWU) conferences allowed only one postseason participant each, for the Rose Bowl.
 Notre Dame did not play in the postseason for 44 consecutive seasons (1925–1968).

Heisman Trophy voting
The Heisman Trophy is given to the year's most outstanding player

Source:

See also
 1965 NCAA University Division football rankings
 1965 College Football All-America Team
 1965 NCAA College Division football season
 1965 NAIA football season

References